Polk Township is one of twenty townships in Benton County, Iowa, USA.  As of the 2000 census, its population was 1,803.

History
Polk Township was founded in 1848.

Geography
According to the United States Census Bureau, Polk Township covers an area of 45.56 square miles (118 square kilometers); of this, 45.47 square miles (117.76 square kilometers, 99.8 percent) is land and 0.09 square miles (0.24 square kilometers, 0.2 percent) is water.

Cities, towns, villages
 Urbana

Unincorporated towns
 Cheney at 
 Spencers Grove at 
(This list is based on USGS data and may include former settlements.)

Extinct towns
 Manatheka at 
(These towns are listed as "historical" by the USGS.)

Adjacent townships
 Homer Township, Buchanan County (north)
 Cono Township, Buchanan County (northeast)
 Grant Township, Linn County (east)
 Fayette Township, Linn County (southeast)
 Washington Township, Linn County (southeast)
 Benton Township (south)
 Taylor Township (southwest)
 Harrison Township (west)
 Jefferson Township, Buchanan County (northwest)

Cemeteries
The township contains these five cemeteries: Cox, Kisling, Saint Marys, Spencers Grove and Urbana.

Major highways
  Interstate 380
  Iowa Highway 150
  Iowa Highway 363
  Iowa Highway 920

School districts
 Center Point-Urbana Community School District
 North Linn Community School District
 Vinton-Shellsburg Community School District

Political districts
 Iowa's 3rd congressional district
 State House District 39
 State Senate District 20

References
 United States Census Bureau 2007 TIGER/Line Shapefiles
 United States Board on Geographic Names (GNIS)
 United States National Atlas

External links

 
US-Counties.com
City-Data.com

Townships in Benton County, Iowa
Cedar Rapids, Iowa metropolitan area
Townships in Iowa
1848 establishments in Iowa
Populated places established in 1848